The Singapore women's national football team represents the city-state of Singapore in international women's football and is organised by the Football Association of Singapore (FAS), the governing body for football in Singapore.

History
Women's football in Singapore has become more popular since the Football Association of Singapore (FAS) took them under its wing in 2000. The rapidly growing interest for this sport holds great promise for the future of women’s football in Singapore. The objectives of the FAS Women’s Football Committee is to increase awareness, knowledge and popularity and raise the standard of the women's football in Singapore. Two decades on, Singapore now has four women's national teams: "A" team, under-19, under-16 and under-14.

Results and fixtures

The following is a list of matches in the last 12 months, as well as any future matches that have been scheduled.

Legend

2022

2023

Coaching staff

Manager history

 K. Balagumaran (2017–2018)
 Stephen Ng Heng Seng (2021–Oct 2022)
 Ratna Suffian (Nov 2022 - Feb 2023)
 Karim Bencherifa (Mar 2023 - )

Players

Current squad (NT) 
The following 22 players were named for the match against   

Caps and goals updated following the match against .

Recent call-ups (NT)
Source

The following players have also been called up to the squad in the last 12 months.

 
 

  

 

 

  
 
  
 WD

Current squad (U18/19) 
The following 23 players are named for the announced for AFC U20 Women’s Asian Cup 2024 Qualifiers. 

Caps and goals to be updated.

Recent call-ups (U18/19)

The following players have also been called up to the squad in the last 12 months.

Current squad (U16) 
The following players were selected for an overseas training camp in Chonburi. 

Caps and goals to be updated.

Notable players
Angeline Chua (2007–2019)
Lim Shiya (2001–20??)
Danelle Tan (2019–present)

Records

*Active players in bold, statistics based on 31st SEA Games squad.

=== Most appearances ===

Top goalscorers

Competitive record

FIFA Women's World Cup

Olympic Games

AFC Women's Asian Cup

*Draws include knockout matches decided on penalty kicks.

Asian Games

AFF Women's Championship

*Draws include knockout matches decided on penalty kicks.

Southeast Asian Games

See also

Sport in Singapore
Football in Singapore
Women's football in Singapore

References

External links
Singapore women's national football team – official website at fas.org.sg 
FIFA profile

 
Asian women's national association football teams